Bornadi Wildlife Sanctuary is a  wildlife sanctuary situated on the foothills of Himalayas bordering Bhutan in the north and in Udalguri district and Baksa District of Assam, India. This sanctuary was named after the river Bornadi which flows on its western border. The sanctuary was established in 1980 to protect the hispid hare (Caprolagus hispidus) and pigmy hog (Porcula salvania). It is home to many birds such as the white-capped redstart and the blue magpie, and deer, Himalayan goat and leopard.

Climate
The climate of the area is warm

Biodiversity
There are mammals such as the pygmy hog, golden langur, clouded leopard, hoolock gibbon and white-winged wood duck and some migratory and local birds like peafowl, hornbill, swamp partridge, Bengal florican, kingfisher, woodpecker.

See also
 Protected areas of Assam

References

External links
 

Wildlife sanctuaries in Assam
Udalguri district
Protected areas established in 1980
Brahmaputra Valley semi-evergreen forests
1980 establishments in Assam